The Samuel Botsford House is a historic house located on County House Road in Jerusalem, Yates County, New York.

Description and history 
It is an Italianate style dwelling built in about 1868. It is constructed of rubble stone with applied wooden ornaments.

It was listed on the National Register of Historic Places on August 24, 1994.

References

Houses on the National Register of Historic Places in New York (state)
Italianate architecture in New York (state)
Houses completed in 1868
Houses in Yates County, New York
National Register of Historic Places in Yates County, New York